Ouezzindougou is a small town and seat of the commune of Mandé in the Cercle of Kati in the Koulikoro Region of south-western Mali. The town lies 17 km southwest of Bamako, the Malian capital, and to the north of the Niger River.

References

Populated places in Koulikoro Region